Logan Mitchell may refer to:

 Logan Mitchell (Big Time Rush)
 Logan Mitchell (freethinker) (1802–1881), British freethinker and writer